Hugh Coles (born 5 September 1992) is an English film and television actor. He is known for his roles in The Festival (2018), Defending the Guilty (2019) and Atlanta (2022) as well as originating the role of George McFly in Back to the Future: The Musical. for which he was nominated for the 2022 Laurence Olivier Award for Best Supporting Actor in a Musical.

Career 
Upon leaving the London Academy of Music and Dramatic Art in 2017, Coles made his film debut as "Rex" in The Festival. He also appeared in smaller roles in Urban Myths and Doc Martin in the same year. In 2019, he appeared as Liam Mingay in the British sitcom Defending the Guilty. More recently he has appeared in Death in Paradise (2021) and as "Socks" in Donald Glover's TV Series Atlanta (2022) 

Since 2019, he has been involved with the original production of Back to the Future: The Musical, including its run at the Manchester Opera House and the Adelphi Theatre in London's West End. For his role as George McFly, Coles won the 2022 WhatsOnStage Award for Best Supporting Actor in a Male Identifying Role. and was nominated for the 2022 Laurence Olivier Award for Best Supporting Actor in a Musical. In October 2022 it was announced that Coles would reprise the role on Broadway, joining co-star Roger Bart when the show opens at the Winter Garden Theatre from June 2023.

Filmography

Accolades

See also 
 List of British actors

References 

British actors
Alumni of the London Academy of Music and Dramatic Art
1992 births
Living people